The Castle Mosque is a Cultural Monument of Albania, located in Lezhë.

References

Cultural Monuments of Albania
Mosques in Albania
Buildings and structures in Lezhë